David Reynolds Ignatius (born May 26, 1950) is an American journalist and novelist. He is an associate editor and columnist for The Washington Post. He has written eleven novels, including Body of Lies, which director Ridley Scott adapted into a film. He is a former adjunct lecturer at the Kennedy School of Government at Harvard University and currently Senior Fellow to the Future of Diplomacy Program. He has received numerous honors, including the Legion of Honor from the French Republic, the Urbino World Press Award from the Italian Republic, and a lifetime achievement award from the International Committee for Foreign Journalism.

Early life and education
Ignatius was born in Cambridge, Massachusetts. His parents are Nancy Sharpless (née Weiser) and Paul Robert Ignatius, a former Secretary of the Navy (1967–69), president of The Washington Post, and former president of the Air Transport Association. He is of Armenian descent on his father's side, with ancestors from Harput, Elazığ, Turkey; his mother, a descendant of Puritan minister Cotton Mather, is of German and English descent.

Ignatius was raised in Washington, D.C., where he attended St. Albans School. He then attended Harvard College, where he studied political theory and graduated magna cum laude in 1973. Ignatius was awarded a Frank Knox Fellowship from Harvard University and studied at King's College, Cambridge, where he received a diploma in economics.

Career

Journalism
After completing his education, Ignatius was an editor at the Washington Monthly before moving to The Wall Street Journal, where he spent ten years as a reporter. At the Journal, Ignatius first covered the steel industry in Pittsburgh. He then moved to Washington, where he covered the Justice Department, the CIA, and the Senate. Ignatius was the Journals Middle East correspondent from 1980 through 1983, during which time he covered the wars in Lebanon and Iraq. He returned to Washington in 1984, becoming chief diplomatic correspondent. In 1985 he received the Edward Weintal Prize for diplomatic reporting.

In 1986 Ignatius left the Journal for The Washington Post. From 1986 to 1990 he was the editor of the "Outlook" section. From 1990 to 1992 he was foreign editor and oversaw the paper's Pulitzer Prize–winning coverage of Iraq's invasion of Kuwait. From 1993 to 1999 he served as assistant managing editor in charge of business news. In 1999 he began writing a twice-weekly column on global politics, economics and international affairs.

In 2000, he became the executive editor of the International Herald Tribune in Paris. He returned to the Post in 2002 when the Post sold its interest in the Herald Tribune. Ignatius continued to write his column once a week during his tenure at the Herald Tribune, resuming twice-weekly columns after his return to the Post. His column is syndicated worldwide by The Washington Post Writers Group. The column won the 2000 Gerald Loeb Award for Commentary and a 2004 Edward Weintal Prize. In writing his column, Ignatius frequently travels to the Middle East and interviews leaders such as Syrian president Bashar al-Assad and Hassan Nasrallah, the head of the Lebanese military organization Hezbollah.

Ignatius's writing has also appeared in the New York Times Magazine, The Atlantic Monthly, Foreign Affairs, The New Republic, Talk Magazine, and The Washington Monthly.

Ignatius's coverage of the CIA has been criticized as being defensive and overly positive. Melvin A. Goodman, a 42-year CIA veteran, Johns Hopkins professor, and senior fellow at the Center for International Policy, has called Ignatius "the mainstream media's apologist for the Central Intelligence Agency," citing as examples Ignatius's criticism of the Obama administration for investigating the CIA's role in the use of torture in interrogations during the Iraq War  and his charitable defense of the agency's motivations for outsourcing such activities to private contractors. Columnist Glenn Greenwald has leveled similar criticism against Ignatius.

On March 12, 2014, he wrote a two-page descriptive opinion on Putin's strengths and weaknesses that was published in the Journal and Courier soon after.

Novels
In addition to being a journalist, Ignatius is a successful novelist. He has written ten novels in the suspense/espionage fiction genre that draw on his experience and interest in foreign affairs and his knowledge of intelligence operations. Reviewers have compared Ignatius's work to classic spy novels like those by Graham Greene. Ignatius's novels have also been praised for their realism; his first novel, Agents of Innocence, was at one point described by the CIA on its website as "a novel but not fiction." His 1999 novel, The Sun King, a reworking of The Great Gatsby set in late-20th-century Washington, is his only departure from the espionage genre.

His 2007 novel, Body of Lies, was adapted into a film by director Ridley Scott. It starred Leonardo DiCaprio and Russell Crowe. Disney and producer Jerry Bruckheimer have acquired the rights to Ignatius's seventh novel, The Increment.

The Quantum Spy, published in 2017, is an espionage thriller about the race between the United States and China to build the world's first hyper-fast quantum computer. His most recent book is The Paladin: A Spy Novel (2020).

Opera
In May 2015, MSNBC's Morning Joe announced that Ignatius would be teaming up with  composer Mohammed Fairouz to create a political opera called The New Prince, based on the teachings of Niccolò Machiavelli. The opera was commissioned by the Dutch National Opera. Speaking with The Washington Post, Ignatius described the broad themes of the opera in terms of three chapters: "The first chapter is about revolution and disorder. Revolutions, like children, are lovable when young, and they become much less lovable as they age. The second lesson Machiavelli tells us is about sexual obsession, among leaders. And then the final chapter is basically is the story of Dick Cheney [and] bin Laden, the way in which those two ideas of what we're obliged to do as leaders converged in such a destructive way."

Other
In 2006 Ignatius wrote a foreword to the American edition of Moazzam Begg's Enemy Combatant, a book about the author's experiences as a detainee at the Guantánamo Bay detention camp. In 2008, Zbigniew Brzezinski, Brent Scowcroft, and Ignatius published America and the World: Conversations on the Future of American Foreign Policy, a book that collected conversations, moderated by Ignatius, between Brzezinski and Scowcroft. Michiko Kakutani of The New York Times named it one of the ten best books of 2008.

Ignatius has been trustee of the German Marshall Fund since 2000. He has been a member of the Council on Foreign Relations since 1984. From 1984 to 1990 he was a member of the governing board of St. Albans School.

In 2011 Ignatius held a contest for The Washington Post readers to write a spy novel. Ignatius wrote the first chapter and challenged fans to continue the story. Over eight weeks, readers sent in their versions of what befalls CIA agents Alex Kassem and Sarah Mancini and voted for their favorite entries. Ignatius chose the winning entry for each round, resulting in a six-chapter Web serial. Winners of the subsequent chapters included Chapter 2, "Sweets for the Sweet," by Colin Flaherty; Chapter 3, "Abu Talib," by Jill Borak; Chapter 4, "Go Hard or Go Home," by Vineet Daga; Chapter 5, "Inside Out," by Colin Flaherty; and Chapter 6, "Onward!," by Gina 'Miel' Ard.

In early 2012 Ignatius served as an adjunct lecturer at the John F. Kennedy School of Government at Harvard University, teaching an international affairs course titled Understanding the Arab Spring from the Ground Up: Events in the Middle East, their Roots and Consequences for the United States. He is currently serving as a senior fellow at the Future of Diplomacy Program at Harvard University.

In 2018, he won a George Polk Award, for his coverage of the Jamal Khashoggi murder.

According to the 2018 membership list, Ignatius is a member of the Trilateral Commission.

Political views 
Ignatius supported the 2003 invasion of Iraq. On a number of occasions Ignatius criticized the CIA and the U.S. government's approach on intelligence. He was also critical of the Bush administration's torture policies.

On March 26, 2014, Ignatius wrote a piece in the Washington Post on the then crisis in Ukraine and how the world will deal with Putin's actions. Ignatius's theory of history is that it is a chaos and that "good" things are not preordained, "decisive turns in history can result from ruthless political leaders, from weak or confused adversaries, or sometimes just from historical accident. Might doesn't make right, but it does create 'facts on the ground' that are hard to reverse." His piece mentioned four-star USAF general Philip M. Breedlove, the current NATO Supreme Allied Commander Europe, and Ukrainian foreign minister Andriy Deshchytsya. Putin, says Ignatius, "leads what by most political and economic indicators is a weak nation—a declining power, not a rising one." He placed great hope in Angela Merkel.

Controversy

2009 Davos incident
At the 2009 World Economic Forum in Davos, Switzerland, Ignatius moderated a discussion including then Turkish prime minister Recep Tayyip Erdoğan, Israeli president Shimon Peres, UN secretary-general Ban Ki-moon, and Arab League secretary-general Amr Moussa. As the December 2008–January 2009 conflict in Gaza was still fresh in memory, the tone of the discussion was lively. Ignatius gave Erdoğan 12 minutes to speak and gave the Israeli president 25 minutes to respond. Erdoğan objected to Peres's tone and raised his voice during the Israeli president's impassioned defense of his nation's actions. Ignatius gave Erdoğan a minute to respond (Erdoğan repeatedly insisted "One minute," in English), and when Erdoğan went over his allocated minute, Ignatius repeatedly cut the Turkish prime minister off, telling him and the audience that they were out of time and that they had to adjourn to a dinner. Erdoğan seemed visibly frustrated as he said confrontationally to the Israeli president, "When it comes to killing, you know well how to kill." Ignatius put his arm on Erdoğan's shoulder and continued to tell him that his time was up. Erdoğan then gathered his papers and walked out, saying, "I do not think I will be coming back to Davos after this because you do not let me speak."

Writing about the incident later, Ignatius said that he found himself "in the middle of a fight where there was no longer a middle. [...] Because the Israel–Palestinian conflict provokes such heated emotions on both sides of the debate," Ignatius concluded, "it was impossible for anyone to be seen as an impartial mediator." Ignatius wrote that his experience elucidated a larger truth about failure of the United States' attempt to serve as an impartial mediator in the Israeli–Palestinian conflict. "American leaders must give up the notion that they can transform the Middle East and its culture through military force," he wrote, and instead "get out of the elusive middle, step across the threshold of anger, and sit down and talk" with the Middle Eastern leaders.

Personal life
Ignatius is married to Dr. Eve Thornberg, with whom he has three daughters. His brother, Adi Ignatius, is editor-in-chief of Harvard Business Review.

Works

Novels

Non-fiction

References

External links

 
 Column archive at The Washington Post
 Column archive at The Daily Star
 Column archive at The Harvard Crimson
 
 
 
 

1950 births
Living people
International Herald Tribune people
Alumni of King's College, Cambridge
American columnists
American foreign policy writers
American male non-fiction writers
American male journalists
American spy fiction writers
American political writers
American people of Armenian descent
American people of English descent
American people of German descent
Harvard College alumni
St. Albans School (Washington, D.C.) alumni
The Washington Post people
American male novelists
Gerald Loeb Award winners for Columns, Commentary, and Editorials